Mark Demsteader (born 1963) is a British figurative artist. According to The Daily Telegraph, he is "one of Britain's best-selling figurative painters".

Biography
Born in Manchester, his formative years were spent in Manchester’s meat market where he would accompany his father 
(Harold Demsteader) to the family butchery and meat-packing business. Completely absorbed in the noise, smells, and sheer physicality of this environment, the young Mark learnt more about the structure of sinew, bone, and flesh—albeit livestock—than in any subsequent life drawing class.

As a teenager passionate about pursuing an artistic career, Mark completed two foundation courses: first and at Oldham and then Rochdale Colleges of Art. However, in the 1980s conceptual art dominated the mainstream market and there were little opportunities for a young figurative painter in Manchester. Forced to return to work at his father’s wholesale butchery, Mark continued to attend life classes throughout the next decade.

In the early 1990s the family business fell victim to the recession and Mark was spurred on to find a commercial outlet for his work. To allow himself time to build a portfolio, he took a job as an art technician at an Oldham grammar school for another ten years. A short course at the Slade School of Fine Art gave him an opportunity to tour the London galleries with his portfolio, but with Brit Art in the ascendency he found drawing out of favour. Eventually, a gallery in Blackheath offered him space in a mixed show where he sold six works. Mark gave notice at the grammar school soon after.

In 1997 he became a founder member of the Neomodern Art Group founded by Guy Denning.

He has held an annual solo exhibition with Panter & Hall in the West End of London since 2004. He is now represented in Daikanyama, Japan by Art Obsession.

Notably, he produced a surreal portrait of musician Anomie Belle for her album Flux, and 34 paintings of Harry Potter actress Emma Watson.

References 

1963 births
Living people
20th-century British painters
British male painters
21st-century British painters
20th-century British male artists
21st-century British male artists